Millbank, London is a street in the City of Westminster, or its immediate area.

Millbank may also refer to:

People with the surname 
 Aaron Millbank (born 1995), English footballer
 Joe Millbank (1919–2002), English footballer
 Joseph Duveen, 1st Baron Duveen of Millbank (1869–1939), British art dealer

Places

Australia 
 Millbank, Queensland, suburb of Bundaberg

Canada 
 Millbank, New Brunswick
 Millbank, Ontario, village in Perth County

United Kingdom 
Millbank, London
Millbank Tower, skyscraper at 21–24 Millbank
Millbank Prison, open 1821–86, now the location of Tate Britain art gallery
Millbank, metonym for MI5
 Millbank, Aberdeenshire, location in Scotland
 Millbank, County Antrim, village in the Newtownabbey Borough Council area of Northern Ireland
 Millbank, Highland, area of Thurso, Scotland
 Millbank, Kent, location in Hoath parish, England

United States 
 Milbank, South Dakota
 Millbank (Winchester, Virginia)
 Millbank (Port Conway, Virginia), listed on the U.S. National Register of Historic Places

See also 
 Milbank (disambiguation)